Namanana (stylized in all caps) is the second studio album by Chinese singer-songwriter Lay. It was released on October 19, 2018 by SM Entertainment. The album features 22 tracks in total, 11 of which are in Chinese language with English counterparts for each, including the two singles "Give Me a Chance" and "Namanana". The album marks the singer's US debut under the name Lay Zhang.

Background and release 
On September 21, Lay announced his US debut with a full-length album, set to be released on October 19. The artist participated in producing each track of the album. On September 28, it was announced that Lay would pre-release his song "Give Me a Chance" on October 5, which was co-written and co-composed by Bazzi, and that he would also release the music video of the song on his birthday, October 7.

On October 5, the track "Give Me a Chance" was released along with a teaser of the music video. On October 7, the music video of "Give Me a Chance" was released. On October 16, the album teaser was released and the digital pre-sale in China started. On October 18, Namanana music video teaser was released. On October 19, the album and the music video of the title track "Namanana" were officially released.

Promotion 
Lay performed the title track "Namanana" on Tencent's Yo! Bang music show on October 21. The singer performed "Give Me a Chance" and on episode 8 of the Chinese program Idol Hits, aired on October 26, as well as episode 9, aired on November 2.

Lay began promoting Namanana in the United States on November 2, where he was interviewed by BUILD Series NYC. On November 5, Lay appeared on WNYW's Good Day New York, where he talked about his album and performed "Namanana". On the same day, the singer had an interview on the People Now program. Lay held a free fan event in New York City on November 6, 2018, at the PlayStation Theater.

Singles 
"Give Me a Chance" was released on October 5.

Commercial performance 
Within 11 minutes and 11 seconds of the album's pre-sale in China on October 16, Namanana broke eight records and reached Double Diamond on QQ Music. It became the fastest digital album to break all the certifications in such a short time. The album broke the ninth record on QQ Music and reached the Hall of Fame Gold Diamond status in 11 hours and 57 minutes.

Namanana became QQ Music's best selling album of 2018 and the fastest to receive all 9 QQ Music sales certifications. As of December 11, Namanana became the best selling album of all time on QQ Music, with 23.4 million renminbi (RMB) in sales.

Track listing 
The track list is taken from QQ Music

Charts

Weekly charts

Year-end charts

Sales

Accolades

Release history

References

External links 
 "Give Me a Chance" music video on YouTube
 "Namanana" music video on YouTube

2018 albums
SM Entertainment albums
Lay Zhang albums
IRiver albums